Major Richard Burnard Munday was an English flying ace credited with scoring nine aerial victories during World War I. He was notable for scoring Britain's first night victory; he also excelled as a balloon buster at the rare feat of shooting down enemy observation balloons at night.

Early life
Richard Burnard Munday was born in Plymouth, England on 31 January 1896. He was the eldest son of Major General and Mrs. R. C. Munday of Port Royal, Plymouth.

World War I
Details of Munday's entry into military service are unknown. However, on 16 February 1915 he lost his probationary status as his rank of flight sub-lieutenant in the Royal Naval Air Service was confirmed, and on the same day he was awarded Royal Aero Club Aviator's Certificate No. 1085. He had trained in a Maurice Farman biplane at the military flight school at Brooklands.

Having completed his pilot's training, he began his aviation duties. He was slightly wounded on 28 December 1915, though details are unknown.

Munday served as an instructor at Cranwell during 1916; one of his pupils was Leonard Henry Rochford. Munday was promoted to flight lieutenant on 1 April 1916.

He was appointed an acting-flight commander on 3 December 1916. On 26 April 1917, Flight magazine reported that Munday had been accidentally injured in the line of duty.

His first aerial success came on 18 August 1917. His second through sixth victories were over observation balloons; most unusually, Munday downed enemy balloons at night, scoring Britain's first night victory in the process. By 21 February 1918, his victory tally had reached nine. His valour earned Munday the Distinguished Service Cross, gazetted on 16 March 1918:

On 20 September 1918, he was also awarded the Belgian Croix de guerre.

List of aerial victories

Post World War I
Munday remained in service postwar. On 1 August 1919, in the Royal Air Force revamping, Munday was granted a permanent commission in the rank of major.

Munday was reassigned from occupation duty with the British Army of the Rhine in Germany when posted to the RAF Depot, Inland Region, back in England, on 16 January 1922. He was then assigned to the Headquarters of the Coastal Area on 1 February.

On 11 December 1922 Munday was posted to the Seaplane Training School (Coastal Area) as a supernumerary officer, then on 29 April 1923 he was posted to RAF Gosport to join No. 422 Flight.

On 27 May 1925, Secretary of State for Air Samuel Hoare recommended the award of the Air Force Cross to Munday; the recommendation read:

On 3 June 1925, Munday was awarded the Air Force Cross as a sixtieth birthday honour from King George V.

On 1 January 1927, he was promoted from flight lieutenant to squadron leader.

Richard Burnard Munday married Marie Jose de Reul of Brussels in her native city on 26 April 1930.

On 8 May 1930 he was again posted to Headquarters, Coastal Area.

On 5 May 1932, Squadron Leader Munday retired from the Royal Air Force due to ill health. He died on 11 July 1932.

References
Citations

Bibliography
 

1896 births
1932 deaths
Military personnel from Plymouth, Devon
Royal Naval Air Service personnel of World War I
Royal Air Force officers
British World War I flying aces
Recipients of the Distinguished Service Cross (United Kingdom)
Recipients of the Air Force Cross (United Kingdom)
Recipients of the Croix de guerre (Belgium)